Iphis or Iphys, in Greek mythology, was the daughter of Telethusa and Ligdus in Crete.

Iphis may also refer to:

Mythical/fictional character names
Iphis (name), the name of eight characters in Greek mythology
Iphis, the name used to refer to the daughter of Jephthah in early modern literature

Literary works
Iphis, an opera by Elena Kats-Chernin
Iphis et Iante, a comedy by Isaac de Benserade

In biology
Iphis monarch, a species of bird
Aleuron iphis, a species of moth
Iphis casalis, a species of mite
Coenonympha iphis, a species of butterfly
Ogyris iphis, a species of butterfly in the genus Ogyris
Culex iphis, a species of mosquito, see List of Culex species
Pyrrochalcia iphis, a species of skippers in the genus Pyrrhochalcia